Chen Chung-jen (born around 1990) is a Taiwanese badminton player. In 2013, he won the men's doubles titles  at the Polish and Singapore International tournament partnered with Wang Chi-lin.

Achievements

BWF International Challenge/Series
Men's Doubles

 BWF International Challenge tournament
 BWF International Series tournament

References

External links
 

Taiwanese male badminton players
Living people
Place of birth missing (living people)
Year of birth missing (living people)
21st-century Taiwanese people